Ali Merchant is an Indian Actor, anchor, DJ and music producer.

Merchant has appeared in over 35 Television shows including Fiction and Non-fiction on all prime channels like Colors, MTV, Star Plus, Life Ok, Sony TV, Zee TV, Channel V. He has also anchored Non-Fiction shows on Star Plus like Nachbaliye special episodes and as a Solo host for Gladrags Mega Model and Manhunt for 3 consecutive seasons on Channel V.

He is also a musician having various official remixes on music labels like T-series, Zee Music and Speed records.

Career 

At the age of 17, Merchant won the Mr. Bombay title. He has 2 albums in his credits in the start of his career such as Tabaahi on Speed Records and Kadak on Ali Merchant (independent channel)

Merchant has appeared in over 35 television shows, including fiction and non-fiction on all prime channels like Colors, MTV, Star Plus, Life Ok, Sony TV, Zee TV, Channel V. He has also anchored non-fiction shows on Star Plus like Nachbaliye special episodes and as a Solo host for Gladrags Mega Model and Manhunt for 3 consecutive seasons on Channel V. Ali has always been loved by his fans for his cool personality and spunky look.

Personal life 

Merchant grew up in a Muslim household in Mumbai. He was married to TV actress Sara Khan, in an Islamic wedding ceremony at Bigg Boss 4 in 2010, but they divorced after two months in 2011. Close friends of the couple stated that the couple was paid  for the marriage. The Colors channel denied that it had paid them for the marriage and called it their personal wish. After the divorce she called the marriage a nightmare. Merchant said in an episode of the reality show Sach Ka Saamna that he had married for publicity and that marrying Khan was the biggest mistake of his life.

Television 
{| class="wikitable" style="text-align:center;"
! Year
! Serial
! Role
|-
| 2006
| rowspan="6" | Ssshhhh...Phir Koi Hai 
| Rahul (Episode 1)
|-
| rowspan="5" | 2007
| Inspector (Episode 18)
|-
| Rajkumar Aditya Singh (Episode 25)
|-
| Narendra (Episode 35)
|-
| Karan (Episode 40)
|-
| Sandeep (Episode 52)
|-
| 2007–2008
| Amber Dhara
| Akshat
|-
| rowspan="2" | 2008
| [[TV series|Rubi]]| Kunal Oberoi
|-
| Nach Baliye 4| Presenter (Along with Sara Khan)
|-
| rowspan="2" | 2009
| Ghar Ek Sapna| Ansh Verma 
|-
| Saat Phere: Saloni Ka Safar| Rajveer
|-
| 2009-2010
| Raja Ki Aayegi Baraat| Kunwar Angad
|-
| 2009-2011
| Yeh Rishta Kya Kehlata Hai 
| Rituraj
|-
| rowspan="4" | 2010
| Bandini| Vishal Mehra
|-
| Aahat| Vishal
|-
| Do Hanson Ka Jodaa| Rishi
|-
| Bigg Boss 4 || Guest
|-
| 2011
| Looteri Dulhan| Ronit
|-
| rowspan="3" | 2013
| Hum Ne Li Hai- Shapath| Anuj/Ajay 
|-
| Welcome – Baazi Mehmaan Nawazi Ki| Contestant
|-
| Yeh Hai Aashiqui| Rudra
|-
| 2014
| Fear Files| Vishesh
|-
| rowspan="2" | 2016
| Box Cricket League 2| Contestant
|-
| Sadda Haq (Season 2)| Nirmaan
|-
| 2018
| Vikram Betaal Ki Rahasya Gatha| Malkhan Singh
|-
| 2022
| Lock Upp (Season 1)| Contestant (Entered on Day 15 and Evicted on Day 56)

|}

 Albums
He has 2 albums each year :

 Tabaahi on Speed Records
 Kadak on Ali Merchant (independent channel)

- Best trending DJ by Celeb M awards 2019

Single remixes

 Gulabo (Zee Music) 
 Aao Raja (Zee Music)
 Bad Boys Mashup (T-Series).

 Events 

 March 2020 :

⁃	Sunburn Holi shared stage with Vini Vici and Ritviz

 Feb 2020 :

⁃	Bollyboom 2020 shared stage with Diljit Dosanjh.

 Jan 2020 and Sept 2019 :

⁃	Headlined on 1 Night for India’s 1st 3Nights Luxury cruise festival at Jalesh cruises .

 New Years eve 2020

⁃	Performed  for 3000 Indian Army Colonel, Major and Generals and their family members.

 Nov 2019 ( Coca-Cola Arena - Dubai)

⁃	Opened the DaBang Concert at Coca-Cola arena for Bollywood Actors like Salman Khan, Katrina Kaif, Daisy Shah, Jacqueline Fernandez, Prabhu Deva, Guru Randhawa'' and others .

 Aug/ Sept 2019 :

⁃	Ali Merchant Kadak album India Club Tour. (7cities)

 June/ July / AuG 2019 :

⁃	Bollywood Arena : Shared stage with Guru Randhawa for 5 cities

 March 2019 :

⁃	Sunburn Holi : Shared stage with DJ Snake .

⁃	Headlined Bollyboom Holi 2019

 Sept/Oct 2018 : (India Tour)

⁃	Bollyboom Ali Merchant India club tour ( 5 Cities)

 May - October : (India tour w/ other artist)

⁃	Shared stage with Guru Randhawa for 7 Cities

 March 2018 :

⁃	Headlines Bollyboom holi (BKC - Grounds)

References

External links 
 
 

Living people
Male actors from Mumbai
Indian male television actors
Indian male soap opera actors
Male actors in Hindi television
21st-century Indian male actors
Bigg Boss (Hindi TV series) contestants
1984 births